The 1999 CIAU football season began on September 10, 1999, and concluded with the 35th Vanier Cup national championship on November 27, 1999, at the SkyDome in Toronto, Ontario, with the Laval Rouge et Or winning the first Vanier Cup in program history. Twenty-four universities across Canada competed in CIAU football this season, the highest level of amateur play in Canadian football, under the auspices of the Canadian Interuniversity Athletics Union (CIAU). The Regina Rams began their first season of play in the CIAU after previously playing in the Canadian Junior Football League.

Regular season

Standings 
Note: GP = Games Played, W = Wins, L = Losses, T = Ties, PF = Points For, PA = Points Against, Pts = Points

Teams in bold earned playoff berths.

Post-season awards

Award-winners 
 Hec Crighton Trophy – Phil Côté, Ottawa
 Presidents' Trophy – Mike Letendre, Saskatchewan
 Russ Jackson Award – Carlo Panaro, Alberta
 J. P. Metras Trophy – Tyson St. James, British Columbia
 Peter Gorman Trophy – Sébastien Roy, Mt. Allison

All-Canadian team

Post-season

Playoff bracket

Championships 
The Vanier Cup was played between the champions of the Atlantic Bowl and the Churchill Bowl, the national semi-final games. This year, the Dunsmore Cup Ontario-Quebec champion Laval Rouge et Or hosted the Canada West Hardy Trophy champion Saskatchewan Huskies for the Churchill Bowl. The winners of the Atlantic conference Loney Bowl championship, the Saint Mary's Huskies, hosted the Ontario conference's Yates Cup championship team, Waterloo Warriors, for the Atlantic Bowl. The Saint Mary's Huskies appeared in their fifth Vanier Cup game while the Laval Rouge et Or, whose program began in 1996, made their first appearance in the championship game. The 35th Vanier Cup was played in Toronto's SkyDome where the Rouge et Or defeated the Huskies 14–10 to claim the team's first Vanier Cup championship.

Notes 

U Sports football seasons
CIS football season